is a passenger railway station located in the city of Fukaya, Saitama, Japan, operated by the private railway operator Chichibu Railway.

Lines

Station layout
The station is staffed and consists of a single island platform serving two tracks.

Platforms

Adjacent stations

History
The station opened on March 14, 1985.

Passenger statistics
In fiscal 2018, the station was used by an average of 393 passengers daily.

Surrounding area
 Arakawa River

References

External links

 Aketo Station information (Saitama Prefectural Government) 
 Aketo Station timetable 

Railway stations in Japan opened in 1985
Railway stations in Saitama Prefecture
Stations of Chichibu Railway
Fukaya, Saitama